William Walesby (died 1458) was a Canon of Windsor from 1441 to 1450 and Archdeacon of Chichester from 1444 to 1444.

Career
He was appointed:
Prebendary of Church of St Mary de Castro, Leicester 1431
Dean of Church of St Mary de Castro, Leicester 1431 - 1450
Rector of North Crawley, Buckinghamshire 1439 - 1449
Rector of Holy Trinity, Upper Chelsea until 1450
Prebendary of Hurst in Chichester 1421
Chaplain to the King
Archdeacon of Chichester 1440
Prebendary of Lincoln 1441
Prebendary of Fordington and Writhlington in Salisbury 1444 - 1458
Rector of Hayes, Middlesex 1450 - 1458
Prebendary of St Stephen's Westminster 
Dean of St Stephen's Westminster 1445

He was appointed to the ninth stall in St George's Chapel, Windsor Castle in 1441 and held the canonry until 1450.

Notes 

1458 deaths
Canons of Windsor
Archdeacons of Chichester
Deans of St Stephen's Chapel, Westminster
Year of birth unknown